Thiruvathira or Thiruvathirai or Arudhra Darisanam is a Hindu festival celebrated in the Indian states of Kerala and Tamil Nadu. Thiruvathirai (Arudhra) in Tamil means "sacred big wave". In Chidambaram in Tamil Nadu, the Sri Natarajar temple's annual Festival, is celebrated on this date. In the month of Makaram Thiruvathira Star is celebrated in Mathira Peedika Devi Temple, owned by Thiruvithamcore Devaswom Board, near Kadakkal in Kollam District of Kerala state. Thiruvathira has a connection with lord moon.

Arudra Darisanam in Chidambaram (Thillai)

Thiruvadirai – Arudra Darshan is celebrated in a grand manner in 5 Sabhas of Sri Natarajar, namely 1) Kanakasabha (Gold) –  at Chidambaram (Thillai or Tillai), 2) Velli Sabhai (Silver) at Madurai, 3) Ratnasabha (Ruby) at Tiruvalankadu, 4) Tamrasabha (Copper) at Tirunelveli, 5) Chitrasabha (Pictures) at Kutralam.

In Thillai Chidambaram 10 day Festival is held during Thiruvathirai. On the 9th day night (i.e., 10th day very early morning) Maha Abhishekam will be done to Lord Nataraja and Goddess Sivakamasundari at Raja Sabhai at around 3 am. The MahaAbhishekam will be held for about 3–4 hours.

Then special Thiruvabaranam (Sacred Jewels) Alankaram, Rahasiya Pujai will be done to Sri Natarajar. Pancha Murthi Thiruveethi Ula, will be held at around 12 pm Noon. Soon after Pancha Murthi Ula in the afternoon Lord Natarajar and Goddess Sivakami will bless devotees with Aarudra Darisanam and enter Kanaka Sabhai (Golden Sabha).

As the story goes Shesha, the divine bed serpent of Shri Vishnu, or Patanjali, along with the flower devotee sage of Shri Shiva, named Vyaghrapada, wanted to see the cosmic dance of God Shiva, and thus performed severe penance for many days at Nataraja Temple, Chidambaram. Pleased by their devotion, ultimately, God Shiva appeared before them to perform his dance of bliss or cosmic dance, as also granted the sage a boon to have tiger legs, so that he could pick flowers in the morning, to offer to God Shiva, without being stung by the bees.

Origin

It takes place on the full moon night in the Tamil month of Margazhi (December–January) and this is also the longest night in a year. Literary and historical evidence in the form of stone inscriptions state that the festival has been celebrated on this day for more than 1500 years. Lord Shiva is praised in Tamil by many names, one of them is Athiraiyan (ஆதிரையன் ), from Thiruvathirai (Thiru + Athirai).

Tamil hymns of Maanikavasagar's Thiruvasagam (particularly the hymns Thiruvempavai and Thiruppalliezhuchi) are chanted in temples. On the very day of Thiruvathirai the idols of Nataraja (Lord Shiva) and his consort Shivagami (Parvati) are taken out of the temple premises for a grand procession. It is one of the major events in almost all the Shiva temples in Tamil Nadu.

Sambandar sung in Tevaram during 7th-9th century, how Thiruvathirai celebrated at Kabaleeshwaram (present day Mylapore, Chennai).

"ஊர்திரை வேலை யுலாவும் உயர்மலைக்
கூர்தரு வேல்வல்லார் கோற்றங் கோள் சேரிதனில்
கார்தரு சோலைக் கபாலீச்சரம் அமர்ந்தான்
ஆதிரைநாள் காணாதே போதியார் பூம்பாவாய்"

Appar wrote a separate pathigam (10 songs) in Tevaram, in the name Thiruvathirai Pathigam which describes the importance and celebrations of Thiruvathirai.

In 4th Tirumurai he sang about the celebration in Tiruvarur

"முத்து விதான மணிப்பொற் கவரி முறையாலே
பக்தர்க ளோடு பாவையர் சூழப் பலிப்பின்னே
வித்தகக் கோல வெண்டலை மாலை விரதிகள்
அத்தனாரூ ராதிரை நாளா லதுவண்ணம்"

The cosmic dance of Lord Shiva represents five activities – Creation, Protection, Destruction, Embodiment and Release. In essence, it represents the continuous cycle of creation and destruction. This cosmic dance takes place in every particle and is the source of all energy. Arudra Darshan celebrates this ecstatic dance of Lord Shiva.

It is essentially a Shaivite festival and celebrates the cosmic dance of Lord Shiva, which is represented by the Nataraja form. Arudhra (Thiruvathirai in Tamil) signifies the golden red flame and Shiva performs the dance in the form this red-flamed light. Lord Shiva is supposed to be incarnated in the form of Lord Nataraja during the Arudra Darshan day.

Most of the temples around the world with Lord Nataraja and Shiva as deity perform the Arudhra Darshan. Neivedhyam (food for God) made for Lord Nataraja on that day is Thiruvathirai Kali.

The festival is celebrated by Sri Lankan Tamils at Thinnapuram Sundareswarar Temple, it is called Eezhathu Chidambaram.

As there is no date for Arudra Darshan in 2022, it will be celebrated twice in 2023, which is a common occurrence for same.

Significance in Tamil Nadu

In Tamil Nadu, mainly in the Kongunadu region, the married women will fast during the day time. They will take food before sunrise and start their fasting (called Thiruvempavai Nonbu). They will break the fast after witnessing the moon rise. Nonbu (fasting) starts nine days before and ends on Thiruvathirai day so totally they fast for ten days.

There is special food called Thiruvadhirai kali made of Rice, Jaggery, Moong dhall, Coconut, Cardamom and Ghee with Thiruvathirai ezhlu curry koottu, which is made out of seven vegetables, that is cooked and served on this day. They choose from Pooshanikai (pumpkin), Paranghikai (ash gourd), Vazhakkai (plantain), Pacha mochai (field beans), Sarkaraivalli kizhangu (sweet potato), Cheppan kizhangu (colocasia), Urulai kizhangu (potato), Katharikai (eggplant) etc.

The dancing form of Lord Shiva is taken out on procession from all Shiva temples in Tamil Nadu. In Chidambaram, The night before the full moon, Abishekam, or holy shower, to the Lord Shiva is performed with the nine most precious gems (navarathnam), including diamonds, coral, pearls, jade and emerald, among others. On the day of full moon, the chariot procession takes place. The most important Arudhra Darshan festival takes place at the Chidambaram Shiva Temple in Tamil Nadu. The cosmic dance of Lord Shiva is enacted on the day.

Significance in Kerala

It is believed that on this day, the Goddess Parvathi finally met Lord Shiva after her long penance and Lord Shiva took
Both Parvathi and Shiva present this ideal to devotees in the form of Ardhanarishvara (half male, half female form). Another belief is that the festival commemorates the death of Kamadeva, the Hindu god of erotic desire.

In Kerala, Thiruvathira is an important traditional festival along with the other popular festivals, Onam and Vishu. This has been celebrated by the Brahmin communities like Nambuthiri and Pisharody and Nair communities of Kerala from days of yore. It is largely a festival for women; unmarried women observe a partial fast on this day to get good husbands and married women take a fast from the preceding day (Makayiram nakshatra) and on the day of Thiruvathira for the well-being of their husband and family. The first Thiruvathira of a newly wedded woman is her poothiruvathira.
 
The fast essentially involves abstaining from rice-based food. The typical meal includes cooked broken wheat and Thiruvathira puzhukku, a delightful mix of tuber vegetables: colocasia (chembu), yam (chena), Chinese potato (koorka), sweet potato (madhurakizhangu) with long beans (vanpayar) and raw plantain fruit (ethakaya), cooked with a thick paste of freshly ground coconut.

Thiruvathirakali is a dance form performed by women on the day of Thiruvathira to the accompaniment of Thiruvathira paattu, folk songs telling tales of lovesick Parvati, her longing and penance for Lord Shiva's affection and Shiva's might and power. The sinuous movements executed by the group of dancers around a nilavilakku embody lasya or the amorous charm and grace of the feminine. The dance follows a circular, pirouetting pattern accompanied by clapping of the hands and singing. Today, Thiruvathirakali has become a popular dance form for all seasons. Thiruvathira kali is a typical dance form of Kerala. This is a female group dance made up of simple yet very attractive steps. In ancient times, women use to perform this dance in their homes during festivals and functions, giving it the Malayalam name aka Kaikottikali: aka-inside + kaikottikali-play clapping hands. Lore has it that Thiruvathira Kali is in memory of Lord Siva taking Parvathi as his wife. A group of women dressed in typical Kerala style with mundu and neriyathu and the hair bun adorned with jasmine garlands perform this dance during festival seasons. Kaikottikkali spreads the message of joy and also illustrates the emotions of a married woman towards her beloved and of the unmarried woman longing for one. Thiruvathira is also known as the Kerala's own version of Karva Chauth

World records related to ThiruvathiraKali
The record for the world's largest Thiruvathira belongs to Twenty20 Kizhakkambalam. The 16-minute performance, held on 1 May 2017, has been adjudged the largest Thiruvathira ever held with a total of 6,582 girls and women in the age group of 10-75 participating in it. Along with 2,500 woman and children from Kerala, a Russian woman and more than 4,500 woman from 20 other states too took part in the event. Women were trained by renowned teachers and practitioners of the dance form for the 16 minutes performance. The traditional "Kasavu Mundu and Neriyath" worn by the dancers were provided by Kitex Group. The event was organised by Twenty20Kizhakkambalam, the CSR wing of the Kitex Group, along with Chavara Cultural Centre and the Parvanendu School of Thiruvathira.

"The record for the world's largest Thiruvathira belongs to Twenty20 Kizhakkambalam," said Rishi Nath, adjudicator of Guinness World Record while handing over the certificate to Sabu M Jacob MD Kitex Apparel Park and Chief Co ordinator Twenty20.

The previous Guinness Record for largest Kaikottikkali dance performance set on 2 February 2015 with 5211 women led by Smt. Jitha Binoy under the banner "Thanima" of Irinjalakuda, Thrissur. The previous Guinness record for largest Kaikottikkali dance was achieved on 9 November 2012 at Dombivli near Mumbai by the Mumbai Pooram foundation, a socio-cultural organisation. In the true Onam Spirit, 2639 women including Keralites, Maharashtrians, Gujarathis, Bengalees, Tamilians, Telugu, Kannadigas and others from all parts of the country representing all religions danced to the tunes of specially written songs. On 14 December 2013, over 3000 women participated in a  Thiruvathira Kali  event held at Kochi and attempted to set a new world record. The event was organised in connection with the Thiruvathira festival which falls on 18 December 2013.

References 

Hindu festivals
Festivals in Tamil Nadu
Hinduism in Tamil Nadu
Hindu festivals in Kerala
December observances
January observances
Religious festivals in India
Observances held on the full moon